The Citadel is a novel by A. J. Cronin, first published in 1937, which was groundbreaking in its treatment of the contentious theme of medical ethics. It has been credited with laying the foundation in Britain for the introduction of the NHS a decade later. In the United States, it won the National Book Award for 1937 novels, voted by members of the American Booksellers Association.

For his fifth book, Dr. Cronin drew on his experiences practising medicine in the coal-mining communities of the South Wales Valleys, as he had for The Stars Look Down two years earlier. Specifically, he had researched and reported on the correlation between coal dust inhalation and lung disease in the town of Tredegar. He had also worked as a doctor for the Tredegar Medical Aid Society at the Cottage Hospital, which served as the model for the National Health Service.

Cronin once stated in an interview, "I have written in The Citadel all I feel about the medical profession, its injustices, its hide-bound unscientific stubbornness, its humbug ... The horrors and inequities detailed in the story I have personally witnessed. This is not an attack against individuals, but against a system."

Plot summary 
In October 1924, Andrew Manson, an idealistic, newly qualified doctor, arrives from Scotland to work as assistant to Doctor Page in the small (fictitious) Welsh mining town of Drineffy (Blaenelly is the name given in some adaptations). He quickly realises that Page is unwell and disabled and that he has to do all the work for a meagre wage. Shocked by the unsanitary conditions he discovers, Manson works to improve matters and receives the support of Dr Philip Denny, a cynical semi-alcoholic who, Manson finds out in due course, took a post as an assistant doctor after having fallen from grace as a surgeon. Resigning, he obtains a post as assistant in a miners' medical aid scheme in "Aberalaw", a neighbouring coal mining town in the South Wales coalfield. On the strength of this job, Manson marries Christine Barlow, a junior school teacher.

Christine helps her husband with his silicosis research. Eager to improve the lives of his patients, mainly coal miners, Manson dedicates many hours to research in his chosen field of lung disease. He studies for, and is granted, the MRCP, and when his research is published, an MD. The research gains him a post with the "Mines Fatigue Board" in London, but he resigns after six months to set up a private practice.

Seduced by the thought of easy money from wealthy clients rather than the principles he started with, Manson becomes involved with pampered private patients and fashionable surgeons and drifts away from his wife. A patient dies because of a surgeon's ineptitude, and the incident causes Manson to abandon his practice and return to his principles. He and his wife repair their damaged relationship, but then she is run over by a bus and killed.

Since Manson has accused the incompetent surgeon of murder, he is vindictively reported to the General Medical Council for having worked with an American tuberculosis specialist, Richard Stillman, who does not have a medical degree, even though the patient had been successfully treated at his clinic. Stillman's treatment, that of pneumothorax, involved collapsing an affected lung with nitrogen, and was not universally accepted at the time.

Despite his lawyer's gloomy prognosis, Manson forcefully justifies his actions during the hearing and is not struck off the medical register.

Historical context
The novel is of interest because of its portrayal of a voluntary contribution medical association which is based (not entirely uncritically) on the Tredegar Medical Aid Society for which Cronin worked for a time in the 1920s, and which in due course became the inspiration for the National Health Service as established under Aneurin Bevan.

The Citadel was extremely popular in translation, being sold in book shops in the Third Reich as late as 1944. The scholar and Holocaust survivor Victor Klemperer noted, "English novels are banned of course; but there are books by A.J. Cronin in every shop window: he’s Scottish and exposes shortcomings of social and public services in England." After the Second World War, it proved popular in Communist bloc countries as well, where Cronin was one of the few contemporary British authors to be published.

Adaptations
The novel was made into a 1938 film with Robert Donat, Rosalind Russell, Ralph Richardson and Rex Harrison, and television versions include one American (1960), two British (1960 and 1983), and two Italian (1964 and 2003) adaptations of the novel. There are also three film adaptations of the novel in Indian languages: Tere Mere Sapne (1971) in Hindi, Jiban Saikate (1972) in Bengali and Madhura Swapnam (1982) in Telugu. In 2017, an adaptation for radio by Christopher Reason was featured as the BBC Radio 4 15 minute drama. In June 2021, a longer radio adaptation was broadcast by Radio 4 as two 45-minute episodes, written by Christopher Reason and Tom Needham.

References

External links 
The Literature, Arts, and Medicine Database
Book summary (Archived version)
Analysis of The Citadel
Excerpt from "Health in Gwent"
History of healthcare in the South Wales Coalfield
Article about Cronin and the NHS
"The Citadel" on The Campbell Playhouse (January 21, 1940) with Orson Welles and Geraldine Fitzgerald

1937 British novels
Novels by A. J. Cronin
Medical novels
Novels set in London
National Health Service
Mining in Wales
National Book Award for Fiction winning works
British novels adapted into films
Novels set in Wales
British novels adapted into television shows
Fiction set in 1921
Little, Brown and Company books
Victor Gollancz Ltd books
Medical ethics in fiction